Upper  Stowe is a village in West Northamptonshire in England. It is in the civil parish of Stowe Nine Churches . It has a church dedicated to St James. This was built to the design of P.C Hardwick in 1855. It has a bellcote rather than a tower.

The name 'Stowe' derives from Old English word for 'place'.

References

External links 

Villages in Northamptonshire
West Northamptonshire District